Chickens is a 1921 American silent comedy drama film directed by Jack Nelson and written by Agnes Christine Johnston based on the story "Yanconna Yillies" by Herschel S. Hall. The film stars Douglas MacLean, Gladys George, Claire McDowell, Charles Hill Mailes, Raymond Cannon, and Willis Marks. The film was released on February 13, 1921, by Paramount Pictures. It is not known whether the film currently survives.

Cast
 Douglas MacLean as Deems Stanwood
 Gladys George as Julia Stoneman
 Claire McDowell as Aunt Rebecca
 Charles Hill Mailes as Dan Bellows
 Raymond Cannon as Willie Figg
 Willis Marks as Philip Thawson
 Al W. Filson as Decker

References

External links

1921 films
1920s English-language films
1921 comedy-drama films
Paramount Pictures films
Films directed by Jack Nelson
American black-and-white films
American silent feature films
1920s American films
Silent American comedy-drama films